KCBI (90.9 MHz) is a listener-supported FM radio station, licensed to Dallas and serving the Dallas-Fort Worth Metroplex in North Texas.  It airs a Christian radio format and is owned by First Dallas Media Inc. (FDMI)  The station plays Contemporary Christian music during drive times and middays, with Christian talk and teaching programs in late mornings, evenings and overnight.

KCBI has an effective radiated power (ERP) of 100,000 watts, the maximum for non-grandfathered FM stations.  The transmitter is off West Belt Line Road in Cedar Hill, among the towers for other Dallas-area FM and TV stations.

History 
KCBI began with its antenna atop the First International Building in downtown Dallas. Power was 1,500 watts at 660 feet above average terrain, a fraction of its current output.

The 90.9 spot traces its beginning to KCHU, a non-commercial FM that went on air August 29, 1975. KCHU operated until September 1977 when it went off air owing to financial shortfalls. The station remained silent through 1980, license renewal year in Texas. (Radio stations then operated on a three-year license cycle.) At the same time, Criswell operated KCBI-FM from a downtown Dallas rooftop with a power of 1,500 watts on 89.3. They aspired to raise power and height by relocating to the Cedar Hill, Texas, tower farm, and applied to take over the 90.9 frequency of KCHU. A legal and FCC struggle ensued. The result was a swap of frequencies, a settlement of litigation, and return of KCHU (renamed KNON) to the air as a new license.

From the early years through 2012, KCBI was generally programmed as a Christian Teaching station, featuring Bible teachers such as Chuck Swindoll, David Jeremiah, Tony Evans, Robert Jeffress and John MacArthur.  With the format showing signs of decline, KCBI began shifting to a ‘more music and personalities’ format in 2013, highlighting Contemporary Christian artists such as Chris Tomlin, Mercy Me, Casting Crowns and Tobymac.  The current version of KCBI's programming offers music and personalities throughout most of the day, and teaching ministries in the evening hours.  Many of its original teaching programs continue to be aired on KCBI.

On September 5, 2017, the First Baptist Church in Dallas, operator of FDMI, ended a 41-year joint management of KCBI with Criswell College, and became the sole member of FDMI.

KCBI also is involved in community service on many levels, including an annual station initiative to provide Bibles to the Texas community, including prisons around the DFW area. KCBI was the 2017 National Religious Broadcasters "Station of the Year," an honor awarded at the NRB convention in Orlando.

On-Air Staff 
Notable weekday hosts include mornings with Caryn & Jeremy Cruise, mid-days with Doug Hannah, and afternoons with Sonny Delfyette.

Other FDMI stations
FDMI also owns and operates KCBN in Hico, Texas, as well as the online KCBI All-Teaching Channel.

FDMI previously owned KCRN-AM-FM in San Angelo, Texas and KCBK in Frederick, Oklahoma, serving the Lawton/Wichita Falls area. In September 2018, the San Angelo stations were sold for $205,000 to Houston Christian Broadcasters and became KCCE AM and KSAO FM. KCBK, which was silent at the time, was sold the next week to South Central Oklahoma Christian Broadcasting for $250,000.

References

External links
KCBI official website

 DFW Radio Archives
 DFW Radio/TV History
FCC History Cards for:
the defunct 90.9 license
KCBI at 89.3

CBI
CBI
Radio stations established in 1976
1976 establishments in Texas